Herbert Weston Scott Howell III is an American entrepreneur and political media consultant whose client list includes former President George W. Bush, Senate Majority Whip John Thune - SD, US Senator Lindsey Graham, SC, US Senator Mike Rounds, SD and Gov Kristi Noem, SD. Other notable clients included Meg Whitman and Rudy Giuliani.

Personal
Married in 1994, he and his wife Julie reside in the Dallas-Fort Worth area and have two children.

Career
In a 2006 interview, Howell discussed his early career in some detail. Recruited by Lee Atwater to work for the RNC after his 1988 work for presidential candidate Bob Dole, Howell spent four years as a campaign operative before moving to Texas in 1992 to work for Karl Rove, then running a direct-mail firm. In 1993, Howell started his own political advertising consulting firm Scott Howell & Company. As of December 2020, SHC maintains a political presence but today is a more diversified with emphasis VR, Digital and other areas. See GrooveJones.com; PushDigital.com; FrothyBeardBrewing;  Scott Howell and Company.

In 2004 he was part of the Bush/Cheney'04 strategy team producing ads for President Bush's successful reelection.

Howell has played a major
role electing more than 20 US Senators and his campaign experience spans more than 40 states. Successful United States Senate campaigns for Republicans include: 
Jerry Moran of Kansas who defeated fellow Congressman Todd Tiahrt in a hotly contested primary in 2010
John Thune of South Dakota, who defeated incumbent Senator Minority Leader Tom Daschle
Tom Coburn of Oklahoma, who defeated Brad Carson
Bob Corker of Tennessee, who defeated Harold Ford, Jr.
Jim DeMint of South Carolina who defeated Inez Tennenbaum. 
 Three senate campaigns for Lindsey Graham of South Carolina including the most expensive US Senate race in history in 2020. 
Other notables races:
Saxby Chambliss of Georgia
Jim Talent of Missouri 
Norm Coleman of Minnesota in 2002
Ron Johnson of Wisconsin in 2016
Kristi Noem  the first female governor of South Dakota in 2018 

Howell has also been involved in more than a hundred congressional, legislative, judicial and issue campaigns.  Noteworthy corporate clients have included American Airlines, Texas Rangers Baseball Club, the Dallas Cowboys and the Oil and Gas Industry. 

Failed clients have included:
George Allen, a United States Senator defeated in 2006 by Jim Webb
Jerry Kilgore, defeated in 2005 by Tim Kaine in  Virginia governor's race
Rudy Giuliani who withdrew from the 2008 presidential primary season.
Norm Coleman of Minnesota in 2008 who lost his reelection in a controversial recount after winning on election day.

Notable campaigns

2020 South Carolina Senate Race

Content to follow

2002 Georgia Senate Race

In 2002, Howell's client Saxby Chambliss defeated incumbent Senator Max Cleland. Supporters of Cleland blamed a Chambliss TV ad featuring the likenesses of Osama bin Laden and Saddam Hussein, while criticizing Cleland's votes against homeland security measures. The ad, which Cleland supporters claimed questioned the senator's patriotism, was removed after protests from prominent politicians including Republicans like John McCain and Chuck Hagel.  Chambliss supporters claimed the ad didn't question Cleland's patriotism, but rather his judgment. Although these ads are frequently mentioned as examples of work by Scott Howell, Howell has repeatedly denied that he produced this particular ad.

2006 Tennessee Senate Race

In October 2006, Howell was revealed as the producer, with Terry Nelson, of the "Harold, Call Me" attack ad used against democratic Tennessee Senatorial candidate Rep. Harold Ford Jr. in which a white woman said that she had met Ford at a Playboy party.  The ad concludes with the woman speaking to the camera and saying to Ford "Call me."

Coverage of the controversy characterized Howell as a "protégé" of Karl Rove.

References

External links
 
2002 contributions by Scott Howell and Julie Howell to Oklahoma campaign of Republican Tom Jeffrey Cole.
2006 contribution by Julie Howell to "Friends of George Allen - Republican".
"In Rove's Footsteps, They Learned From The Master," "Newsweek," October 2, 2006
CBS News/AP, "Rove protégé Behind Racy Tennessee Ad," October 26, 2006.
Scott Howell & Company.

American political consultants
Living people
Texas Republicans
Year of birth missing (living people)